Qohab-e Rastaq Rural District is a rural district (dehestan) in Amirabad District, Damghan County, Semnan Province, Iran. At the 2006 census, its population was 4,363, in 1,189 families.  The rural district has 51 villages.

References 

Rural Districts of Semnan Province
Damghan County